The 1993 Brisbane Broncos season was the sixth in the club's history. Coached by Wayne Bennett and captained by Allan Langer, they competed in the NSWRL's 1993 Winfield Cup premiership, finishing the regular season 5th (out of 16) before going on to play in a re-match of the previous year's grand final against the St George Dragons and again win, claiming consecutive premierships. In doing so they also became the first team in history to win the premiership from fifth position.

Season summary
After years of dispute with the Lang Park Trust over brewery advertising, Fourex had pouring rights for Lang Park while Powers Brewing was major sponsor of the Broncos. For the 1993 season the Broncos moved to the Council-owned ANZ Stadium, in suburban Nathan.

Signs of a hangover existed with the club losing two of its first three matches, including their debut at the new home ground against the struggling Parramatta Eels. But the Broncos bounced back, beating the Balmain Tigers 50-0, (the highest winning margin for the club at the time) to establish themselves solidly in the upper echelons of the competition.  A last round lapse against St George relegated the Broncos to fifth spot, meaning they had to win four straight elimination games to defend their title. This match also set the club's highest home ground attendance figure with over 58,000 at ANZ Stadium.

In the finals, Brisbane went on to demolish the Manly Sea Eagles' defence in a 36-10 romp. Canberra dropped dead with the loss of Ricky Stuart and the Broncos ran roughshod over them with a 30-12 win. Against the Canterbury Bulldogs in the preliminary final, Brisbane were trailing 16-10 at half time, but Allan Langer scored immediately in the second half to level, then potted a field goal to break the dead lock late in the game with Allan Cann sealing the win scoring under the posts winning the match for the Broncos 23-16.

In the grand final, again against the Dragons, the Broncos were victorious once more, this time 14-6. This win was significant because it was the only time a team which had finished 5th in the minor premiership had gone on to win the competition. It was Glenn Lazarus' fifth consecutive grand final appearance, having already played in the previous year's for Brisbane and the three years' before that for Canberra.

Match results

*Game following a State of Origin match

Scorers

Grand final
                                 Brisbane Broncos vs. St George Dragons

Brisbane 14 (TRIES: Johns, Matterson, Carne; GOALS: O'Neill 1/3)

defeated

St George 6 (GOALS: Herron 3/3)

Halftime: Brisbane 10-2

Referee: Greg McCallum

Stadium: Sydney Football Stadium

Crowd: 42,329

Clive Churchill Medal: Brad Mackay (St George)

Honours

League
Winfield Cup Premiership

Club
Player of the year: Allan Langer
Rookie of the year: Wendell Sailor
Back of the year: Willie Carne
Forward of the year: Kerrod Walters
Club man of the year: Chris Johns

References

Brisbane Broncos seasons
Brisbane Broncos season